Cashiella is a genus of fungi in the family Dermateaceae. The genus contains four species. Cashiella, circumscribed in 1951 by Franz Petrak, is named in honor of American mycologist Edith Katherine Cash.

See also
List of Dermateaceae genera

References

Dermateaceae genera
Dermateaceae
Taxa named by Franz Petrak
Taxa described in 1951